Bosta (English: The Autobus Arabic: Bosta — بوسطة) is a 2005 Lebanese film by the director Philippe Aractingi. Bosta is a story of young Lebanese artists who meet again, after being separated, and tour different cities of Lebanon in an old bus, performing a techno version of the dabkeh that shocks conservatives, but moves forward towards the future. Simon Emmerson and Martin Russell from the group, Afro Celt Sound System composed original music for the dabkeh (dance) sequences and composed the film's underscore respectively.

Quoting from the official site: Bosta is a road musical that takes the audience on a wonderful journey across various Lebanese regions... a journey accompanied by a groundbreaking soundtrack and, of course, this truly pioneering dance, the electro-dabkeh.

Bosta was the best selling film in Lebanon in 2006.  The movie was submitted as the official Lebanese entry in the 79th Academy Awards (Oscars) in the Best Foreign Language Film category.

References

External links
Official website

Trailer of the movie
An edited suite of music from Martin Russell's underscore (streaming audio).
Dana Trometer Editing Website

2005 films
Lebanese war drama films
2000s Arabic-language films
2000s musical films